Paucartambo may refer to:

 Paucartambo Province, Cusco region
 Paucartambo District, Paucartambo
 Paucartambo District, Pasco
 Paucartambo, Paucartambo
 Paucartambo, Pasco Province